The Paris Red Peppers Minor League Baseball team played in the East Texas League in 1946 and the Big State League In 1947. The Peppers were based in the United States city of Paris, Texas, and were affiliated with the St. Louis Browns of the American League.

Frank Sacka, Bob Prichard, Pat McLaughlin and Homer Peel played for the team in 1946. Peel also managed the club. Eddie Carnett, Frank Carswell and Jim Walkup were with the team in 1947. The club was managed by Lloyd Rigby in that season.

See also
Paris Rockets

References

Paris, Texas
St. Louis Browns minor league affiliates
Defunct minor league baseball teams
Defunct baseball teams in Texas
Professional baseball teams in Texas
Baseball teams established in 1946
1946 establishments in Texas
Defunct Big State League teams
Baseball teams disestablished in 1947
East Texas League teams